Saul Winstein (October 8, 1912 – November 23, 1969) was a Jewish Canadian chemist who discovered  the Winstein reaction. He argued a non-classical cation was needed to explain the stability of the norbornyl cation.  This fueled a debate with Herbert C. Brown over the existence of σ-delocalized carbocations. Winstein also first proposed the concept of an intimate ion pair. He was co-author of the Grunwald–Winstein equation, concerning solvolysis rates.

Richard F. Heck, who earlier in his career had undertaken postgraduate studies with Winstein, won the 2010 Nobel Prize in Chemistry.

References

External links
 UCLA Biography 
 Saul Winstein UCLA

1912 births
1969 deaths
Jewish Canadian scientists
 Jewish chemists
Canadian chemists
National Medal of Science laureates
Canadian expatriates in the United States